The Heritage 35 is a Canadian sailboat that was designed by Americans McCurdy & Rhodes as a cruiser and first built in 1974.

Production
The design was built by Heritage Yacht Builders in Oakdale, Ontario, Canada. The company built 14 boats between 1974 and 1977. The moulds were then purchased by Grampian Marine of Oakville, Ontario, but that company went out of business later in 1977, before producing any boats.

The Heritage 35 design was later developed into the Intrepid 35, using the same tooling and moulds.

Design
The Heritage 35 is a recreational keelboat, built predominantly of fibreglass, with wood trim. It has a masthead sloop rig; a raked stem; a raised counter, reverse transom; a skeg-mounted rudder controlled by a tiller and a fixed fin keel. It displaces  and carries  of ballast.

The boat is fitted with a Westerbeke MG1500 diesel engine for docking and manoeuvring.

The design has sleeping accommodation for five people, with a double "V"-berth in the bow cabin, two straight settee berths in the main cabin and an aft berth on the port side. The galley is located on the starboard side just forward of the companionway ladder. The galley is "L"-shaped and is equipped with a stove, an ice box and a sink. A navigation station is opposite the galley, on the port side. The head is located just aft of the bow cabin on the port side.

See also
List of sailing boat types

References

External links
Heritage 35 photo gallery

Keelboats
1970s sailboat type designs
Sailing yachts
Sailboat type designs by McCurdy & Rhodes
Sailboat types built by Heritage Yacht Builders